The Swedish Tax Agency is a government agency in Sweden responsible for national tax collection and administering the population registration.

The agency was formed on 1 January 2004 through the merger of the Swedish National Tax Board (Riksskatteverket) and the then 10 existing regional tax authorities (skattemyndigheter).

The Swedish Tax Agency (and prior to that, the Swedish National Tax Board) was also formerly the parent agency of the Swedish Enforcement Administration (Kronofogdemyndigheten). Since 1 July 2008, the Swedish Enforcement Administration is an independent agency but with close administrative ties to the Swedish Tax Agency.

The agency has local offices in over a hundred cities across Sweden, with the headquarters located in Solna, Stockholm County.

See also 
 Taxation
 Taxation in Sweden
 Swedish Taxpayers' Association
 Population registration in Sweden
 Swedish F-tax certificate
 Skatterättsnämnden

References

External links 
 
 Tax registration of foreign companies and sole traders in Sweden, Swedish Tax Agency

Tax Agency
Taxation in Sweden
2004 establishments in Sweden
Revenue services
Civil registries
Government agencies established in 2004
Public finance of Sweden